Serail may refer to:

Saray (building), an administrative building (from Turkish , meaning palace)
Saray (harem), a building or buildings for a harem (also from Turkish , meaning palace)
Grand Serail of Aleppo
Grand Serail in Beirut
Die Entführung aus dem Serail, 1782 opera by Wolfgang Amadeus Mozart